The Institute of Molecular Biology and Genetics of the National Academy of Sciences of Ukraine (IMBG of the NASU) is a scientific research organisation in Kyiv, Ukraine. Founded in 1973 as a branch of the National Academy of Sciences of Ukraine, the institute specialises in genomics, proteomics, bioinformatics, genetic engineering and cellular engineering.

External links
Official website (in English)

Research institutes in Ukraine
Research institutes in the Soviet Union
Genetics or genomics research institutions
1973 establishments in the Soviet Union
Medical and health organizations based in Ukraine